Platy is a town and a municipality in eastern Imathia, Greece. Since the 2011 local government reform it is part of the municipality Alexandreia, of which it is a municipal unit. The municipal unit has an area of 181.375 km2.

History
Platy was founded in 1924 by Greek refugees from Turkey after the Asia Minor Catastrophe. They came from the villages of the Farassa area in Cappadocia (today the village in Turkey is called Çamlıca (Faraşa) in Yahyalı Province of Kayseri). After many stops on their journey, their final destination was Platy. Before Platy was founded, there was a small village strategically near a railway station. It was 35 km from Veria, 40 from Thessaloniki and 512 from Athens. When Platy was founded it remained a small village with 2,300 inhabitants (as a separate community) but with a very important role in the area of Imathia. In the industrial area of Platy until the mid-1990s there were over 1,500 workers from Platy, Veria and Thessaloniki. However, after the economic crisis of 1999-2002, many of the factories based in the industrial zone of Platy were closed. Today there are only three factories, one of them being of national importance (the sugar state-owned factory "EBZ" or the Hellenic Sugar Industry S.A.). Some other small factories are based in the same industrial zone. In 1994, Platy absorbed three smaller communities and in 1998 another nine. Today, Platy is the centre of the municipal unit of Platy (about 11,000 inhabitants). The town has a population of about 2,300.

Subdivisions
The municipal unit Platy is subdivided into the following communities (constituent villages in brackets):
Platy (Platy, Ergotaxio Loudia)
Arachos
Kleidi
Koryfi (Koryfi, Neochoropoulo, Palaiochora)
Lianovergi (Palaiochori)
Platanos
Prasinada (Prasinada, Kydonia, Niselloudi)
Trikala

Population

Transport

Road
Platy can be accessed by bus or car (following A1, A2 - Egnatia Odos and the E90 routes).

Rail
The settlement is served at the junction of the Piraeus–Platy Line and Thessaloniki–Bitola Line. The station is served by intercity trains between Athens and Thessaloniki, andby Proastiakos Thessaloniki services to Katerini and Larissa, Edessa, Florina and Thessaloniki.

Air
There have been recent discussions about upgrading the old military airport 2 km NW of Platy for civil use.

See also
List of settlements in Imathia

References

External links
 Official web page (inactive)
 Platy on the GTP Travel Pages

Populated places in Imathia